Gulabo is a 2008 Pakistani Punjabi language film by Sangeeta, with music composed by Zulfiqar Ali and song lyrics by Saeed Gillani.

Cast
 Shaan
 Resham
 Babar Ali
 Saima
 Raheela Agha
 Shamil Khan
 Fareeha Jabeen
 Nasir Chinyoti
 Iftikhar Thakur

Soundtracks

 "Paake Paritaan Wey Mein Mar Gai Aan" Sung by Azra Jehan, film song lyrics by Saeed Gillani and music by Zulfiqar Ali
 "Piplaan Di Chaawain Beith Ke Aa Kariye Gallan Pyar Diyyan" Sung by Azra Jehan, film song lyrics by Saeed Gillani and music by Zulfiqar Ali

Accolades

References

External links

Punjabi-language Pakistani films
2008 films
Films directed by Sangeeta (Pakistani actress)
2000s Punjabi-language films